Pyral SAS is a manufacturer of magnetic recording media products, based in Avranches, France. As of 2015, it is a subsidiary of Mulann, a French company in the smartcard and ticketing industry.

In 1934, Pyral created a new type of transcription disc. Their innovation was to coat the aluminum disc with a layer of lacquer. These discs came to be known as lacquers or acetates.

As of 2007, The company's primary product is perforated magnetic tape, used to record sound for movie productions.  They also produce magnetic inks and slurries used in the production of magnetic stripe cards.

Corporate history 

 Pyral made the originals blank disks for the NASA Voyager spacecraft.
 Pyral was originally based in Créteil, France, but moved to the Avranches location in 1985. 
 Prior to 2004, it was part of EMTEC, BASF, and Rhône-Poulenc.   
 From 2004 until the acquisition by Mulann, it was an independent company.
 In 2012, Pyral acquired RMGI, a maker of analog tape used for sound recording.
 In 2015, after financial difficulties integrating RMGI, Pyral was acquired by Mulann.

References

External links 
 Corporate website

Manufacturing companies of France
French brands